Artsakh, officially the Republic of Artsakh or the Nagorno-Karabakh Republic, is a doubly landlocked breakaway state in the South Caucasus whose territory is internationally recognised as part of Azerbaijan. Artsakh controls a part of the former Nagorno-Karabakh Autonomous Oblast, including the capital of Stepanakert. It is an enclave within Azerbaijan.

The predominantly Armenian-populated region of Nagorno-Karabakh was claimed by both the Azerbaijan Democratic Republic and the First Republic of Armenia when both countries became independent in 1918 after the fall of the Russian Empire. A brief war over the region broke out in 1920. The dispute was largely shelved after the Soviet Union established control over the area, and created the Nagorno-Karabakh Autonomous Oblast (NKAO) within the Azerbaijan SSR in 1923. 

In the leadup to the fall of the Soviet Union in the late 1980s, the region re-emerged as a source of dispute between Armenia and Azerbaijan. In 1991, a referendum held in the NKAO and the neighbouring Shahumyan Province resulted in a declaration of independence. Ethnic conflict led to the 1991–1994 Nagorno-Karabakh War. Conflict has sporadically broken out since then, most significantly in the Second Nagorno-Karabakh War.

The Republic of Artsakh is a presidential democracy with a unicameral legislature. The country is reliant on and closely integrated with Armenia, in many ways functioning as a de facto part of Armenia. The population is 99.7% ethnic Armenian, and the primary spoken language is Armenian. The population is overwhelmingly Christian, most being affiliated with the Armenian Apostolic Church. Several historical monasteries are popular with tourists. They come mostly from the Armenian diaspora, as most travel can take place only between Armenia and Artsakh.

Etymology

According to scholars, inscriptions dating to the Urartian period mention the region under a variety of names: "Ardakh", "Urdekhe", and "Atakhuni". In his Geography, the classical historian Strabo refers to an Armenian region which he calls "Orchistene", which is believed by some to be a Greek version of the old name of Artsakh.

According to another hypothesis put forth by David M. Lang, the ancient name of Artsakh possibly derives from the name of King Artaxias I of Armenia (190–159 BC), founder of the Artaxiad Dynasty and the kingdom of Greater Armenia.

Folk etymology holds that the name is derived from "Ar" (Aran) and "tsakh" (woods, garden) (i.e., the gardens of Aran Sisakean, the first nakharar of northeastern Armenia).

The name "Nagorno-Karabakh", commonly used in English, comes from the Russian name which means "Mountainous Karabakh". Karabakh is a Turkish/Persian word thought to mean "black garden". The Azerbaijani name for the area, "Dağlıq Qarabağ", has the same meaning as the Russian name. The term "Artsakh" lacks the non-Armenian influences present in "Nagorno-Karabakh". It was revived for use in the 19th century, and is the preferred term used by the locals, in English and Russian as well as Armenian. "Mountainous Karabakh" was sometimes employed directly as part of the official English name, "Republic of Mountainous Karabakh". This reflected an attempt to shift away from the negative associations thought linked with "Nagorno-Karabakh" due to the war.

History

The earliest record of the region covered by modern-day Artsakh is from Urartian inscriptions referring to the region as Urtekhini. It is unclear if the region was ever ruled by Urartu, but it was in close proximity to other Urartian domains. It may have been inhabited by Caspian tribes and/or by Scythians.

After decades of raids by the Cimmerians, Scythians, and the Medes, Urartu finally collapsed with the rise of the Median Empire, and shortly after, the geopolitical region previously ruled as Urartu re-emerged as Armenia. By the fifth century BC, Artsakh was part of Armenia under the Orontid Dynasty. It continued to be part of the Kingdom of Armenia under the Artaxiad Dynasty, under which Armenia became one of the largest realms in Western Asia. At its greatest extent, the Great King of Armenia, Tigranes II, built several cities named after himself in regions he considered particularly important, one of which was the city he built in Artsakh.

Following wars with the Romans and Persians, Armenia was partitioned between the two empires. Artsakh was removed from Persian Armenia and included into the neighbouring satrapy of Arran (also known as Caucasian Albania). At this time, the population of Artsakh consisted of Armenians and Armenicized aborigines, though many of the latter were still cited as distinct ethnic entities. The dialect of Armenian spoken in Artsakh was among the earliest ever recorded dialects of Armenian, which was described around this time in the seventh century AD by a contemporary named Stephanos Siunetzi.

Artsakh remained part of Arran throughout Persian rule, during the fall of Iran to the Muslims, and following the Muslim conquest of Armenia. Under the Arabs, most of the South Caucasus and the Armenian Highlands, including Iberia and Arran, were unified into an emirate called Arminiya, under which Artsakh continued to remain as part of Arran.

Despite being under Persian and Arab rule, many of the Armenian territories, including Artsakh, were governed by Armenian nobility. Arran gradually disappeared as a geopolitical entity, while its population was assimilated by neighbouring ethnic groups with whom they shared a common culture and religion. Many Christians from Arran would form part of the ethnic composition of the Armenians living in modern-day Artsakh.

Fragmentation of Arab authority provided the opportunity for the resurgence of an Armenian state in the Armenian Highlands. One particular noble dynasty, the Bagratids, began annexing territories from other Armenian nobles, which, in the latter half of the ninth century gave rise to a new Armenian kingdom which included Artsakh.

The new Kingdom didn't stay united for long, however, due to internal conflicts, civil wars, and external pressures, Armenia often found itself fragmented between other noble Armenian houses, most notably the Mamikonian and Siunia families, the latter of which would produce a cadet branch known as the House of Khachen, named after their stronghold in Artsakh. The House of Khachen ruled the Kingdom of Artsakh in the 11th century as an independent kingdom under the protectorate of the Bagratid Kingdom of Armenia. Under the House of Khachen, the region historically called Artsakh became synonymous with the name "Khachen".

Following wars with the Byzantine Empire, and with the arrival of Seljuk Turks in the latter half of the 11th century, the Kingdom of Armenia collapsed, and Artsakh became the autonomous Principality of Khachen, ruled by the House of Hasan-Jalalyan, within the Kingdom of Georgia for a short time until the Mongols acquired the region. Although the Armenians of Artsakh did not rule the lands as fully sovereign entities, the mountainous geography of the location allowed them to maintain a semi-independent or autonomous status within other realms, such as the Timurid, Kara Koyunlu, and Ak Koyunlu realms.

During this time, the lands to the west of the Kura River up to the eastern slopes of the Zangezur mountain range became known as Karabakh, with the lands of the Principality of Khachen corresponding to the highlands. During the period of Mongol domination, a great number of Armenians left the lowlands of Karabakh and sought refuge in the mountainous heights of the region.

The Principality of Khachen was eventually divided amongst five Armenian princes, known as meliks, who collectively became known as the Five Melikdoms of Karabakh (also referred to as Khamsa, meaning "five" in Arabic).

In the 16th century, Karabakh came under Iranian rule for the first time in almost a millennium with the rise of the Safavid Empire, within which the territory of modern-day Artsakh became part of the Province of Karabakh. The Armenian princes continued to rule autonomously over the highlands of Karabakh during this time.

In the mid-18th century, the whole of Karabakh became a semi-independent khanate called the Karabakh Khanate which lasted for about 75 years. The Russian Empire advanced into the region in 1805, declared Artsakh a Russian protectorate and formally annexed it from Iran in 1813 according to the Treaty of Gulistan. The Armenian princes lost their status as princes (meliks) in 1822.

Dissolution of the Russian Empire
Following the breakup of the Russian Empire, the Armenians of Nagorno-Karabakh formed an unrecognised polity known as the Karabakh Council in 1918. Due to Azerbaijani–British pressure, the Karabakh Council in August 1919 was forced to provisionally recognise the authority of Azerbaijan pending the Paris Peace Conference's decision on the South Caucasus republics' international borders. As the peace conference was inconclusive regarding Nagorno-Karabakh, the Azerbaijani governor-general of Karabakh, Khosrov bey Sultanov, issued an ultimatum to the Armenians of Karabakh in early 1920, stipulating their acceptance of permanent inclusion into Azerbaijan. Armenia responded by dispatching its agents to organize a rebellion in Nagorno-Karabakh against Azerbaijani rule—the subversive prepations culminated in an abortive uprising that led to the massacre and displacement of Shusha's Armenian population By 1921, Nagorno-Karabakh was in the control of Soviet authorities, who decided on the formation of the Nagorno-Karabakh Autonomous Oblast (NKAO) within Soviet Azerbaijan.

Following the collapse of the Ottoman Empire, the British Empire established itself in Azerbaijan, and advocated that all of Karabakh (including Zangezur and Artsakh) should be part of Azerbaijan until the boundaries can be decided upon peacefully at the upcoming Paris Peace Conference of 1919, but the battles did not cease until the Red Army from Russia began reclaiming the former territories of the Russian Empire and created Soviet Azerbaijan out of the Azerbaijan Democratic Republic in 1920. The Armenians of Zangezur and Artsakh had consistently maintained control of the region and intended to unite with Armenia during the entirety of the two years of chaos, with Azerbaijan only temporarily occupying parts of the regions at certain times. The fall of Azerbaijan gave Armenia the opportunity to properly unite with the Armenian irregulars in Zangezur and Artsakh, but they were taken by the Red Army on 26 May 1920. The rest of Armenia fell to the Red Army shortly after.

The Bolsheviks tried to end the centuries-long rivalry between Russia and Turkey, and in 1921, Joseph Stalin formally transferred the Armenian-populated highlands of Karabakh to Soviet Azerbaijan to try to placate Turkey, though the majority of Zangezur remained within Soviet Armenia. In December 1920 under Soviet pressure central authorities issued a statement that Karabakh, Zangezur and Nakhjivan were all transferred to Armenian control. Stalin (then commissar for nationalities) made the decision public on 2 December, but the Azerbaijani leader Narimanov later denied the transfer.

Under these circumstances, the Soviet Socialist Republics of Armenia, Azerbaijan and Georgia, entering as the Transcaucasian SSR, were admitted to the Soviet Union on 30 December 1922. The inclusion of Artsakh within Soviet Azerbaijan caused an uproar amongst Armenians, which led to the creation of the Nagorno-Karabakh Autonomous Oblast (NKAO) within Soviet Azerbaijan on 7 July 1923 (implemented in November 1924).

Dissolution of the Soviet Union

In the lead-up to the dissolution of the Soviet Union, the Nagorno-Karabakh conflict was revitalised. In 198788, a mass movement started in Nagorno-Karabakh and Soviet Armenia calling on the Soviet authorities to transfer the region to Armenia. Starting with the pogrom against Armenians in the Azerbaijani town of Sumgait in February 1988, the conflict became increasingly violent, and attempts by Moscow to resolve the dispute failed. In summer 1988, the legislatures of Soviet Armenia and the NKAO passed resolutions declaring the unification of Nagorno-Karabakh with Armenia, which were rejected by Azerbaijani and central Soviet authorities. In December 1991, the Armenians of Nagorno-Karabakh declared their independence as the Republic of Nagorno-Karabakh with the intention of reunifying with newly independent Armenia. The declaration was rejected by newly independent Azerbaijan, leading to the outbreak of full-scale war with Armenia and Nagorno-Karabakh on one side and Azerbaijan on the other. The First Nagorno-Karabakh War ended with a ceasefire in May 1994, with Armenian forces controlling practically the entire territory of the former Nagorno-Karabakh Autonomous Oblast as well as most of seven adjacent districts of Azerbaijan. The Republic of Artsakh became a de facto independent country, though closely integrated with Armenia, while its territory remained internationally recognised as part of the Republic of Azerbaijan.

The region re-emerged as a source of dispute between Armenia and Azerbaijan. In 1991, a referendum held in the NKAO and the neighbouring Shahumian region resulted in a declaration of independence. The ethnic conflict led to the 1991–1994 Nagorno-Karabakh War, which ended with a ceasefire along roughly the current borders. According to UNHCR, the conflict resulted in over 600,000 internally displaced people within Azerbaijan.

Intermittent fighting over the region continued after the 1994 ceasefire without significant territorial changes, while long-standing international mediation attempts to create a peace process were initiated by the OSCE Minsk Group in 1994. From late September 2020 until November, significant fighting resumed and Azerbaijan recaptured territories, primarily in the southern part of the region, as well as the strategic town of Shushi. A ceasefire agreement signed on 10 November 2020 between Armenia, Azerbaijan and Russia declared an end to the renewed fighting, and established that Armenia would withdraw from remaining occupied territories surrounding Nagorno-Karabakh over the next month. The agreement includes provisions for a Russian peacekeeping force to deploy to the region, with Russian President Vladimir Putin stating that the ceasefire agreement would "create the conditions for a long-term settlement".

21st century
Artsakh is a de facto independent state, calling itself the Republic of Artsakh. It has close relations with Armenia and uses the same currency, the dram. According to Human Rights Watch, "from the beginning of the Karabakh conflict, Armenia provided aid, weapons, and volunteers. Armenian involvement in Artsakh escalated after a December 1993 Azerbaijani offensive. The Republic of Armenia began sending conscripts and regular Army and Interior Ministry troops to fight in Artsakh." The politics of Armenia and the de facto Artsakh are so intertwined that Robert Kocharyan served as the first President of the Nagorno-Karabakh Republic, from 1994 to 1997, then as prime minister of Armenia from 1997 to 1998, and then as the second President of Armenia, from 1998 to 2008.

However, Armenian governments have repeatedly resisted internal pressure to unite the two, due to ongoing negotiations under the auspices of the OSCE Minsk Group. In his case study of Eurasia, Dov Lynch of the Institute for Security Studies of WEU believes that "Karabakh's independence allows the new Armenian state to avoid the international stigma of aggression, despite the fact that Armenian troops fought in the war between 1991–94 and continue to man the Line of Contact between Karabakh and Azerbaijan." Lynch also cites that the "strength of the Armenian armed forces, and Armenia's strategic alliance with Russia, are seen as key shields protecting the Karabakh state by the authorities in Stepanakert". Some sources consider Artsakh as functioning de facto as a part of Armenia.

 The mediation process is at a standstill, with the most recent discussions in Rambouillet, France, yielding no agreement. Azerbaijan has officially requested Armenian troops to withdraw from all disputed areas of Azerbaijan outside Nagorno-Karabakh, and that all displaced people be allowed to return to their homes before the status of Karabakh can be discussed. Armenia does not recognise Azerbaijani claims to Nagorno-Karabakh and believes the territory should have self-determination. Both the Armenian and Artsakhi governments note that the independence of Artsakh was declared around the time the Soviet Union dissolved and its members became independent. The Armenian government insists that the government of Artsakh be part of any discussions on the region's future, and rejects ceding occupied territory or allowing refugees to return before talks on the region's status.

Representatives of Armenia, Azerbaijan, France, Russia and the United States met in Paris and in Key West, Florida, in early 2001. Despite rumours that the parties were close to a solution, the Azerbaijani authorities – both during Heydar Aliyev's period of office, and after the accession of his son Ilham Aliyev in the October 2003 elections – have firmly denied that any agreement was reached in Paris or Key West.

Further talks between the Azerbaijani and Armenian presidents, Ilham Aliyev and Robert Kocharyan, were held in September 2004 in Astana, Kazakhstan, on the sidelines of the Commonwealth of Independent States (CIS) summit. Reportedly, one of the suggestions put forward was the withdrawal of the occupying forces from the Azeri territories adjacent to Artsakh and then holding referendums (plebiscites) in Artsakh and Azerbaijan proper regarding the future status of the region. On 10 and 11 February 2006, Kocharyan and Aliyev met in Rambouillet, France, to discuss the fundamental principles of a settlement to the conflict. Contrary to the initial optimism, the Rambouillet talks did not produce any agreement, with key issues such as the status of Artsakh and whether Armenian troops would withdraw from Kalbajar still being contentious.

Talks were held at the Polish embassy in Bucharest in June 2006. Again, American, Russian, and French diplomats attended the talks that lasted over 40 minutes. Earlier, Armenian President Kocharyan announced that he was ready to "continue dialogue with Azerbaijan for the settlement of the Nagorno-Karabakh conflict and with Turkey on establishing relations without any preconditions".

According to Armenian foreign minister in 2006, Vardan Oskanyan, no progress was made at this latest meeting. Both presidents failed to reach a consensus on the issues from the earlier Rambouillet conference. He noted that the Kocharyan-Aliyev meeting was held in a normal atmosphere. "Nevertheless," he added, "the foreign ministers of the two countries are commissioned to continue talks over the settlement of the Nagorno-Karabakh conflict and try to find common points before the next meeting of the presidents."

The major disagreement between both sides at the Bucharest conference was the status of Artsakh. Azerbaijan's preferred solution would be to give Artsakh the "highest status of autonomy adopted in the world" in 2012. Armenia, on the other hand, endorsed a popular vote by the inhabitants of Artsakh to decide their future, a position that was also taken by the international mediators. On 27 June, the Armenian foreign minister said both parties agreed to allow the residents of Artsakh to vote regarding the future status of the region. The Azerbaijani Ministry of Foreign Affairs officially refuted that statement. According to Azeri opposition leader Isa Gambar, however, Azerbaijan did indeed agree to the referendum. Still, nothing official has confirmed this yet.

The "Prague Process" overseen by the OSCE Minsk Group was brought into sharp relief in the summer of 2006 with a series of rare public revelations seemingly designed to jump-start the stalled negotiations. After the release in June of a paper outlining its position, which had until then been carefully guarded, U.S. State Department official Matthew Bryza told Radio Free Europe that the Minsk Group favoured a referendum in Karabakh that would determine its final status. The referendum, in the view of the OSCE, should take place not in Azerbaijan as a whole, but in Artsakh only. This was a blow to Azerbaijan, and despite talk that their government might eventually seek a more sympathetic forum for future negotiations, this has not yet happened.

On 10 December 2007 Azerbaijan's deputy foreign minister said Azerbaijan would be prepared to conduct anti-terrorist operations in Nagorno-Karabakh against alleged bases of the Kurdistan Workers' Party (PKK). Armenian Foreign Ministry Spokesperson Vladimir Karapetian previously rejected the allegations as "fabricated" and suggested the accusations of the PKK presence were a form of provocation.

In 2008, Azerbaijani president Ilham Aliyev stated that "Nagorno-Karabakh will never be independent; the position is backed by international mediators as well; Armenia has to accept the reality" and that "in 1918, Yerevan was granted to the Armenians. It was a great mistake. The khanate of Iravan was the Azeri territory, the Armenians were guests here". On the other hand, in 2009, the president of the Nagorno-Karabakh Republic Bako Sahakyan declared that "Artsakh will never be a part of Azerbaijan. Artsakh security should never be an article of commerce either. As to other issues, we are ready to discuss them with Azerbaijan.". In 2010 president of Republic of Armenia Serzh Sargsyan in his speech in the Chatham House of the British Royal Institute of International Affairs declared that "Karabakh was never a part of independent Azerbaijan: it was annexed to Azerbaijan by a decision of the Soviet Union party body. The people of Karabakh never put up with this decision, and upon the first opportunity, seceded from the Soviet Union fully in line with the laws of the Soviet Union and the applicable international law".

On 14 March 2008, the United Nations General Assembly passed a non-binding resolution by a vote of 39 to 7, with 100 abstentions, reaffirming Azerbaijan's territorial integrity, expressing support for that country's internationally recognised borders and demanding the immediate withdrawal of all Armenian forces from all occupied territories there. The resolution was supported mainly by members of the Organisation of Islamic Cooperation (OIC) and GUAM, Azerbaijan is a member in both groups, as well as other nations facing breakaway regions. The resolution was opposed by all three members of the OSCE Minsk Group.

On 20 May 2010, the European Parliament adopted a resolution "on the need for an EU strategy for the South Caucasus", which states that EU must pursue a strategy to promote stability, prosperity and conflict resolution in the South Caucasus. The resolution "calls on the parties to intensify their peace talk efforts for the purpose of a settlement in the coming months, to show a more constructive attitude and to abandon preferences to perpetuate the status quo created by force and with no international legitimacy, creating in this way instability and prolonging the suffering of the war-affected populations; condemns the idea of a military solution and the heavy consequences of military force already used, and calls on both parties to avoid any further breaches of the 1994 ceasefire". The resolution also calls for the withdrawal of Armenian forces from all occupied territories of Azerbaijan, accompanied by the deployment of international forces to be organised with respect of the UN Charter in order to provide the necessary security guarantees in a period of transition, which will ensure the security of the population of Artsakh and allow the displaced people to return to their homes and further conflicts caused by homelessness to be prevented; and states that the EU believes that the position according to which Artsakh includes all occupied Azerbaijani lands surrounding Artsakh should rapidly be abandoned. It also notes "that an interim status for Nagorno-Karabakh could offer a solution until the final status is determined and that it could create a transitional framework for peaceful coexistence and cooperation of Armenian and Azerbaijani populations in the region."

On 26 June 2010, the presidents of the OSCE Minsk Group's co-chair countries, France, Russia, and United States made a joint statement, reaffirming their "commitment to support the leaders of Armenia and Azerbaijan as they finalize the Basic Principles for the peaceful settlement of the Nagorno-Karabakh conflict".

During his August 2019 visit to Stepanakert, the Prime Minister of Armenia Nikol Pashinyan presented the strategic development goals set for Armenia for the next three decades. He added that he made no special provision for Nagorno-Karabakh because "Artsakh is Armenia and there is no alternative". Soon afterwards, Armenia's Foreign Minister Zohrab Mnatsakanyan commented on Pashinyan's statement by saying he had "nothing to add" to Pashinyan's formulation of Armenia's position in the conflict.

2020 war and aftermath

On September 27, 2020, fighting broke out between Armenia and Azerbaijan over Artsakh, which may have claimed thousands of lives. Azerbaijan recaptured territories, primarily in the southern part of the region. A ceasefire agreement signed on 10 November 2020 between Armenia, Azerbaijan and Russia declared an end to the renewed fighting, and established that Armenia would withdraw from remaining occupied territories surrounding the former Nagorno-Karabakh Autonomous Oblast over the next month, while maintaining control over the areas of the former oblast that had not been captured during the war. The deal includes provisions for a Russian peacekeeping force to deploy to the region, with Russian President Vladimir Putin stating that he intends for the current agreement to "create the conditions for a long-term settlement".

No UN member states have recognised Artsakh, although some unrecognised and partially recognised states have done so. Various sub-national governments have issued calls for recognition of Artsakh by their national governments.

In 2021, Russia, Azerbaijan, and Armenia held a trilateral meeting about Artsakh. This is expected to be the first of a regular series of meetings between the three countries, per an agreement to promote economic and infrastructure development throughout the region.

Government and politics

Artsakh is a presidential democracy (in the middle of transforming from a semi-presidential one, after the 2017 referendum). The Prime Minister's post was abolished and executive power now resides with the President who is both the head of state and head of government. The president is directly elected for a maximum of two-consecutive five-year terms. The current President is Arayik Harutyunyan who was sworn in on 21 May 2020.

The National Assembly is a unicameral legislature. It has 33 members who are elected for 5-year terms. Elections take place within a multi-party system; in 2009, the American NGO Freedom House ranked the Republic of Artsakh above the republics of Armenia and Azerbaijan with respect to civil and political rights. Five parties have members in the parliament: the Free Motherland party has 15 members, ARF has 8 members, Democratic Party of Artsakh has 7 members, Movement 88 has 2 members and the National Revival party has one member. A number of non-partisan candidates have also taken part in the elections, with some success; in 2015, two of the 33 members to the National Assembly took their seats without running under the banner of any of the established political parties in the republic. Elections in Artsakh are not recognised by international bodies such as the European Union and the Organisation of Islamic Cooperation, as well as numerous individual countries, who called them a source of increased tensions.

Artsakh is heavily dependent on Armenia, and in many ways de facto functions and is administered as part of Armenia. However, Armenia is hesitant to officially recognise Artsakh.

Constitution

The founding documents of the Nagorno-Karabakh Republic were the Proclamation of the Nagorno Karabakh Republic and the Declaration of State Independence of the Nagorno Karabakh Republic. For a long time no constitution was created, with the republic instead declaring Armenian law applied on its territory through a 1992 law. Even when new laws were passed, they were often copies of equivalent Armenian laws.

On 3 November 2006, the then-president of the Nagorno-Karabakh Republic, Arkadi Ghukasyan, signed a decree to hold a referendum on a draft Nagorno-Karabakh constitution. It was held on 10 December of the same year and according to official preliminary results, with a turnout of 87.2%, as many as 98.6 per cent of voters approved the constitution. The first article of the document described the Nagorno-Karabakh Republic, alternatively called the Republic of Artsakh, as "a sovereign, democratic state based on social justice and the rule of law." More than 100 non-governmental international observers and journalists who monitored the poll evaluated it positively, stating that it was held to a high international standard.

However, the vote was criticised harshly by inter-governmental organisations such as the European Union, OSCE and GUAM, which rejected the referendum, deeming it illegitimate. The EU announced it was "aware that a 'constitutional referendum' has taken place," but emphasised its stance that only a negotiated settlement between Azerbaijan and ethnic Armenians could bring a lasting solution. Secretary General of the Council of Europe Terry Davis asserted that the poll "will not be recognized... and is therefore of no consequence".
In a statement, the OSCE chairman in office Karel De Gucht voiced his concern that the vote would prove harmful to the ongoing conflict settlement process, which, he said, had shown "visible progress" and was at a "promising juncture".

The holding of the referendum was also criticised by Turkey, which traditionally supports Azerbaijan because of common ethnic Turkic roots, and has historically had severe tensions with Armenia.

Another referendum was held on 20 February 2017, with an 87.6% vote in favour on a 76% turnout for instituting a new constitution. This constitution among other changes turned the government from a semi-presidential to a fully presidential model. Its name was changed from "Constitution of the Nagorno Karabakh Republic" to "Constitution of the Republic of Artsakh", though both remained official names of the country. The referendum is seen as a response to the 2016 Nagorno-Karabakh clashes.

Foreign relations

The Ministry of Foreign Affairs is based in Stepanakert. Since no UN member or observer currently recognises Artsakh, none of its foreign relations are of an official diplomatic nature. However, the Republic of Artsakh operates five permanent Missions and one Bureau of Social-Politic Information in France. Artsakh's Permanent Missions exist in Armenia, Australia, France, Germany, Russia, the United States, and one for Middle East countries based in Beirut. The goals of the offices are to present the Republic's positions on various issues, to provide information and to facilitate the peace process.

In his 2015 speech, the President of Armenia Serzh Sargsyan stated that he considered Nagorno-Karabakh "an inseparable part of Armenia".

The Republic of Artsakh is neither a member nor observer of the UN or any of its specialised agencies. However, it is a member of the Community for Democracy and Rights of Nations, commonly known as the "Commonwealth of Unrecognized States", and is recognised by Transnistria, Abkhazia and South Ossetia.

Military

According to the Constitution of Artsakh, the army is under the civilian command of the government. The Artsakh Defense Army was officially established on 9 May 1992 as a defence against Azerbaijan. It fought the Azerbaijani army to a ceasefire on 12 May 1994. Currently the Artsakh Defense Army consists of around 18,000–20,000 officers and soldiers. However, only 8,500 citizens from Artsakh serve in the Artsakh army; some 10,000 come from Armenia. There are also 177–316 tanks, 256–324 additional fighting vehicles, and 291–322 guns and mortars. Armenia supplies arms and other military necessities to Artsakh. Several battalions of Armenia's army are deployed directly in the Artsakh zone on occupied Azerbaijani territory.

The Artsakh Defense Army fought in Shusha in 1992, opening the Lachin corridor between Armenia and Nagorno-Karabakh (1992), and staged the defence of the Martakert front from 1992 to 1994.

Current situation

Displaced people

The first Nagorno-Karabakh conflict has resulted in the displacement of 597,000 Azerbaijanis (this figure includes 230,000 children born to internally displaced people (IDPs) and 54,000 who have returned) including Artsakh, and 220,000 Azeris, 18,000 Kurds and 3,500 Russians fled from Armenia to Azerbaijan from 1988 to 1989. The Azerbaijani government has estimated that 63% of IDPs lived below the poverty line as compared to 49% of the total population. About 154,000 lived in the capital, Baku. According to the International Organization for Migration, 40,000 IDPs lived in camps, 60,000 in dugout shelters, and 20,000 in railway cars. Forty-thousand IDPs lived in EU-funded settlements and UNHCR provided housing for another 40,000. Another 5,000 IDPs lived in abandoned or rapidly deteriorating schools. Others lived in trains, on roadsides in half-constructed buildings, or in public buildings such as tourist and health facilities. Tens of thousands lived in seven tent camps where poor water supply and sanitation caused gastrointestinal infections, tuberculosis, and malaria.

The government required IDPs to register their place of residence in an attempt to better target the limited and largely inadequate national and international assistance due to the Armenian advocated and US imposed restrictions on humanitarian aid to Azerbaijan. Many IDPs were from rural areas and found it difficult to integrate into the urban labour market. Many international humanitarian agencies reduced or ceased assistance for IDPs citing increasing oil revenues of the country. The infant mortality among displaced Azerbaijani children is 3–4 times higher than in the rest of the population. The rate of stillbirth was 88.2 per 1,000 births among the internally displaced people. The majority of the displaced have lived in difficult conditions for more than 13 years.

During the 2020 war President Aliyev stated he intends for refugees to return to the area. While many former cities are currently uninhabitable, the Azerbaijani government and some Azerbaijani companies have announced plans to rebuild infrastructure and invest in the newly controlled territories. The Azerbaijani military is clearing mines prior to resettlement, which may take 10–13 years.

280,000 people—virtually all ethnic Armenians who fled Azerbaijan during the 1988–1993 war over the disputed region of Artsakh—were living in refugee-like circumstances in Armenia. Some left the country, principally to Russia. Their children born in Armenia acquire citizenship automatically. Their numbers are thus subject to constant decline due to departure, and de-registration required for naturalisation. Of these, about 250,000 fled Azerbaijan (areas outside Nagorno-Karabakh); approximately 30,000 came from Nagorno-Karabakh. All were registered with the government as refugees at year's end.

Land mines

Mines were laid in the region from 1991 to 1994 by both conflicting parties in the first Nagorno-Karabakh War. The United Nations Development Program (UNDP) claims that 123 people have been killed and over 300 injured by landmines near the disputed enclave of Nagorno-Karabakh since a 1994 truce ended a six-year conflict between ethnic Armenian and Azerbaijani forces.

The HALO Trust, a UK-based demining NGO, is the only international organisation conducting demining in Nagorno Karabakh. They have destroyed 180,858 small arms ammunition, 48,572 units of "other explosive items", 12,423 cluster bombs, 8,733 anti-personnel landmines, and 2,584 anti-tank landmines between 2000 and 2016. By 2018, they had cleared 88% of the territory's minefields, with a target to clear the rest by 2020. The main cities of Stepanakert and Shusha, as well as the main north–south highway, have been cleared and are safe for travel. The demining effort has been largely funded by the United States Agency for International Development (USAID).

Geography

The Artsakh Republic is mountainous, a feature which has given it its former name (from the Russian for "Mountainous/Highland Karabakh"). The largest water body is the Sarsang Reservoir, and the major rivers are the Tartar and Khachen rivers. Most rivers in the country flow towards the Artsakh Valley.

The climate is mild and temperate. The average precipitation can reach  in some regions, and it is foggy for over 100 days a year. Over 2,000 kinds of plants exist in Artsakh, and more than 36% of the country is forested. The plant life on the steppes consists mostly of semi-desert vegetation, while subalpine zone and alpine tundra ecosystems can be found above the forest in the highlands and mountains.

Administrative divisions

Artsakh is divided into seven provinces and one special administrative city. According to the authorities of Artsakh, it consists of the territories in which the Nagorno-Karabakh Republic was proclaimed: the former Nagorno-Karabakh Autonomous Oblast (NKAO), the Shahumyan Region and the Getashen subdistrict; and those territories that formed part of the Republic of Artsakh before the Second Nagorno-Karabakh War.

As of 2022, the territory of Artsakh includes most of four districts of the former Nagorno-Karabakh Autonomous Oblast, with the fifth district, Hadrut Province, completely under Azerbaijani control. Also claimed by Artsakh is the Shahumyan Region of the Azerbaijan SSR, which has been under Azerbaijani control since the First Nagorno-Karabakh War. While the Shahumyan Region was not part of the Nagorno-Karabakh Autonomous Oblast, representatives from Shahumyan declared independence along with the Oblast, and the proclamation of Artsakh includes the Shahumyan region within its borders.

After the end of the Second Nagorno-Karabakh War, an agreement was signed according to which most of the controlled territories of the Republic of Artsakh were transferred to Azerbaijani control, but the Republic of Artsakh continues to claim these territories.

Following the Republic of Artsakh's declaration of independence, the Azerbaijani government abolished the NKAO and created Azerbaijani districts in its place. As a result, some of Artsakh's divisions corresponded with the Azerbaijani districts, while others had different borders.

Demographics

In 2002, the country's population was 145,000, made up of 95% Armenians and 5% others. This composition represents a sharp change from the 1979 and 1989 census, when the Azerbaijani population was 23 and 21.5 per cent, respectively. The annual birth rate was recorded at 2,200–2,300 per year, an increase from nearly 1,500 in 1999.

OSCE report, released in March 2011, estimates the population of the "seven occupied territories surrounding Nagorno-Karabakh" to be 14,000, and states "there has been no significant growth in the population since 2005." An International Crisis Group report published in December 2019 recorded the population of these territories to be 17,000, or 11.48% of the total population: 15,000 west and southwest of the former oblast, and 2000 in the Agdam District.

Until 2000, the country's net migration was at a negative. For the first half of 2007, 1,010 births and 659 deaths were reported, with a net emigration of 27.

According to age group: 15,700 (0–6), 25,200 (7–17) 75,800 (18–59) and 21,000 (60+)

Population by province (2006):
 Stepanakert 54,500 (2013)
 Martuni 23,200
 Martakert 19,000
 Askeran 17,400 (2007)
 Hadrut 12,300 (2009)
 Kashatagh 9,800
 Shushi 5,000 (2009)
 Shahumyan 2,800

Population of the Republic of Artsakh (2000–2008)

Ethnic composition
Ethnic Groups of the Nagorno-Karabakh Autonomous Oblast (1926–1989) and the Republic of Artsakh (2015) according to census data

Languages

Armenian functions as the only state language and an official language in the Republic of Artsakh, and is the native language of over 99% of the population. Under Soviet rule, the ethnic Armenian population of Nagorno-Karabkah became more proficient in Russian than both Azerbaijanis in the region, and Armenians in the Armenian SSR.Few Armenians learnt Azerbaijani, and the language was actively removed following the Nagorno-Karabakh War. While Russian remained in some use after this time, and was valued as a second language, it was not widely spoken at a native level.

Russian is widely spoken in Arstakh, with efforts having been made since late 2020 in the parliament in Stepanakert to establish it as an additional official language; the official justifications for this being that Russian was already the second language of many residents, and that it would create "conditions for deepening cooperation in all spheres, [as well as contributing] to the development of relations within the legal framework." The Parliament of Artsakh approved a bill grating Russian official status on March 25, 2021, with 27 votes in favour, 0 votes against and 2 abstentions.

Cities and towns

The capital and by far largest city in Artsakh is Stepanakert (55,200 inhabitants in 2015), followed by Martuni (5,700), Martakert (4,600), Chartar (4,000), Askeran (2,300), Haterk (c. 1,600), Berdashen (c. 1,600), Vank (c. 1,600), Noragyugh (c. 1,500), Ivanyan (c. 1,400), Taghavard (c. 1,300), Gishi (c. 1,100), Karmir Shuka (c. 1,100), Sos (c. 1,100), Aygestan (c. 1,100) and Khnapat (c. 1,000). This list only includes towns that remain in Artsakh after the 2020 war.

Resettlement attempts after 1994
From 1989 to 1994, there was significant depopulation in the territory that ended up held by Artsakh, leaving only around 40% of the pre-war population. Much of this was due to the displacement and death of Azerbaijani residents in both the former NKOA and the surrounding territories, leaving some former urban areas virtually empty. The Russian minority present also declined, meaning the resulting population was almost 100% Armenian. Beginning in 1995, the population began to increase due to births and immigration.

While the territory captured outside the former NKAO was initially treated as a potential bargaining chip, it slowly began to be seen as part of the country by both officials and the general population. The Stepanakert-based administration launched various programs aimed at bringing in permanent Armenian settlers to the depopulated lands, including into regions previously populated by Azeris, with those that bordered Armenia – Lachin and Kalbajar – being the priority. Lachin was key to a land connection between Armenia and the former NKAO, and Kalbajar had water resources utilised by both Artsakh and Armenia.

Azerbaijan regards this as a violation of Article 49 of the Fourth Geneva Convention, to which Armenia became party in 1993, whereby "[t]he Occupying Power shall not deport or transfer parts of its own civilian population into the territory it occupies". The ruling party of Azerbaijan accuses the Armenian side of artificially changing the demographic situation and the ethnic composition of the occupied region so that it can lay future claims to them, comparing this to the 1950s campaign of resettling diaspora Armenians in previously Azeri-populated locales in Soviet Armenia where Azeris were forcibly deported from in 1948–1950.

In 1979, the total Armenian population of the districts of Kalbajar, Lachin, Qubadli, Zangilan, Jabrayil, Fuzuli and Agdam was around 1,400 people. An OSCE fact-finding mission established at Azerbaijan's request visited these regions in February 2005 with the intention to assess the scale of the settlement attempts. The mission's findings showed that these districts had as of 2005 an overall population of 14,000 people, mostly living in precarious social conditions. It consisted primarily of ethnic Armenians displaced from the non-conflict zones of Azerbaijan during the war. It was noted, however, that most of them had settled in the conflict zone after having lived in Armenia for several years and some held Armenian passports and even voted in Armenian elections. A smaller segment of the settlers was originally from the towns of Gyumri and Spitak in Armenia who had lived in temporary shelters following the devastating 1988 earthquake before moving to Karabakh, as well as a small number of natives of Yerevan who moved there for financial reasons. A field assessment mission revisited the region in October 2010, confirming that there had not been much growth in population or change in the living conditions of the settlers. The Co-Chairs of the Minsk Group who visited Nagorno-Karabakh, Kalbajar and Lachin in 2014 reported seeing signs of improvements in the infrastructure but could not observe any indications that the size of the population had changed in recent years.

By June 2015, an estimated 17,000 of Syria's once 80,000-strong Armenian population had fled the civil war and sought refuge in Armenia. David Babayan, spokesperson of the Artsakh leader Bako Sahakyan, confirmed that some of those refugees had been resettled in Artsakh. The Economist put the number of the resettled families at 30 as of June 2017. In December 2014, Armenian media cited local municipal authorities in stating that dozens of Syrian Armenian families had been resettled in the disputed zone, in particular in the city of Lachin and the village of Xanlıq in Qubadli. Azerbaijan's Minister of Foreign Affairs Elmar Mammadyarov expressed his concern over Armenia's attempts to change the demographic situation in the region and informed of his intention to raise this issue with the Minsk Group.

In February 2019, Armenia's National Security Service director Artur Vanetsyan visited Nagorno-Karabakh amid public concern about Nikol Pashinyan's government alleged readiness to cede some of the Armenian-controlled territories as part of a peace settlement. Vanetsyan pointed out that settling Armenians and investing into infrastructural projects along the Iranian border, in the previously Azeri-populated regions outside of the former autonomous province, was "a clear message" to the international community that there would be no territorial concessions. He referred to the ongoing settlement efforts as a method of "guaranteeing security". Azerbaijan's Foreign Ministry reacted by qualifying Vanetsyan's statement as an "attempt to undermine the peace talks and defy the work of the mediators" and vowed to address the issue to the UN and the OSCE.

The ceasefire ending the 2020 war stipulated that these territories were to be turned over to Azerbaijani control. Armenian settlers in these areas evacuated prior to the arrival of Azerbaijani forces.

Religion

Most of the Armenian population in Artsakh is Christian and are adherents of the Armenian Apostolic Church, which is an Oriental Orthodox Church. Some Eastern Orthodox and Evangelical denominations also exist.

Armenian monasteries and churches

Controlled by Artsakh after 2020
 Amaras Monastery (4th century), located near the villages of Sos and Machkalashen in the Martuni Province. According to medieval chroniclers Faustus Byuzand and Movses Kaghankatvatsi, St. Gregory the Illuminator, the patron saint and evangeliser of Armenia, founded the Amaras Monastery at the start of the fourth century. At the beginning of the fifth century Mesrop Mashtots, the inventor of the Armenian alphabet, established in Amaras the first-ever school that used his script.
 Yeghishe Arakyal Monastery (5th–13th centuries) commemorating St. Yeghishe, the famous evangeliser of Armenia's eastern lands. The church serves as a burial ground for the fifth century's King Vachagan II the Pious, the most well-known representative of the Arranshahik line of east Armenian monarchs. The monastery is located in the Martakert Province.
 Bri Yeghtsi Monastery (13th century) that centres on embedded khachkars, unique-to-Armenia stone memorials with engraved crosses. The monastery is located near the village of Hatsi in the Martuni Province.
 Gandzasar monastery (13th century), ("Գանձասար" in Armenian) is a historical monastery in Artsakh. Artsakhi government's aim is to include the Gandzasar Monastery into the directory of the UNESCO's World Heritage Sites.
 Yerits Mankants Monastery (meaning "three infants" in Armenian; 17th century) is known for hosting the seat of Artsakh's rival clergy to that of the Holy See of Gandzasar. The monastery is located in the Martakert Province.
 Saint John the Baptist Church, located in the town of Martakert, built in 1883.
 Church of St. Nerses the Great, located in the town of Martuni, consecrated in 2004. It is dedicated to the famous Armenian Catholicos, Saint Narses the Great.
 Holy Mother of God Cathedral in the city of Stepanakert, consecrated in 2019.

Controlled by Azerbaijan after 2020
As a result of the 2020 Nagorno-Karabakh War, Azerbaijan took control over territories containing several important Armenian monasteries and churches, such as the monasteries of Dadivank, Tsitsernavank, Gtichavank, and the Ghazanchetsots Cathedral, as well as the churches of Kanach Zham and St. Hovhannes Church (Hadrut region).
 Katarovank Monastery was founded in the fourth century, and is located close to the village of Hin Tagher in the Hadrut Province. The present-day chapel is a 17th-century structure. There are Armenian khachkars near the chapel. The monastery offers a unique panoramic view to the River Araxes.
 Tsitsernavank Monastery (4th century) is the best-preserved example of an Armenian basilica with three naves. The monastery is located in the village of Tsitsernavank in the Kashatagh Province.
 Dadivank Monastery, also known as Khutavank ( – Monastery on the Hill), that was built between the 9th and 13th century. It is one of the most architecturally and culturally significant monasteries in Artsakh. The western façade of Dadivank's Memorial Cathedral bears one of the most extensive Armenian lapidary (stone-inscribed) texts, and has one of the largest collection of medieval Armenian frescoes. Dadivank is named after St. Dadi, a disciple of Apostle Thaddeus who preached the Holy Gospel in Artsakh in the first century. St. Dadi's tomb was later discovered by archaeologists in 2007. The monastery is in the Shahumyan Province and has been placed under the protection of the Russian peacekeeping forces.
 Gtichavank Monastery (13th century) has design features shared with the architectural style of medieval Armenia's capital city of Ani. The monastery is located in the Hadrut Province.
 Ghazanchetsots Cathedral, built 1868–1888 (Սուրբ Ամենափրկիչ Ղազանչեցոց Եկեղեցի – "Surb Amenap'rkich Ghazanchets'ots' Yekeghets'i" in Armenian), also known as the Cathedral of Christ the Savior and the Shushi Cathedral, is an Armenian church located in Shusha. It is the main cathedral and headquarters of the Armenian Apostolic Church's "Diocese of Artsakh".
 Just uphill from the cathedral in Shusha is the church of Kanach Zham ('Green Church' in Armenian), built in 1847.

Education

Education in Artsakh is compulsory, and is free up to the age of 18. The education system is inherited from the old system of the Soviet Union.

Artsakh's school system was severely damaged because of the 1991–1994 conflict. But the government of the Republic of Artsakh with considerable aid from the Republic of Armenia and with donations from the Armenian diaspora, rebuilt many of the schools. Prior to the 2020 war, Artsakh had around 250 schools of various sizes, with more than 200 lying in the regions. The student population was estimated at more than 20,000, with almost half in the capital city of Stepanakert.

Artsakh State University was founded by Artsakh and Armenian governments' joint efforts, with main campus in Stepanakert. The university opening ceremony took place on 10 May 1992.

Yerevan University of Management also opened a branch in Stepanakert.

Economy

The socio-economic situation of the Republic of Artsakh was greatly affected by the 1991–1994 conflict. Yet, foreign investments began to come. The origin of most venture capital comes from Armenians in Armenia, Russia, United States, France, Australia, Iran, and the Middle East.

Notably the telecommunications sector was developed with Karabakh Telecom investing millions of dollars in mobile telephony, spearheaded by a Lebanese company.

Copper and gold mining has been advancing since 2002 with development and launch of operations at Drmbon deposit. Approximately 27–28 thousand tons (wet weight) of concentrates are produced with average copper content of 19–21% and gold content of 32–34 g/t. Azerbaijan considers any mining operations in Nagorno-Karabakh illegal and has vowed to engage an international audit company to determine the damages suffered by Azerbaijan's state-run ore management company as a result. In 2018, the government of Azerbaijan announced that it was planning to appeal to an international court and the law enforcement agencies of the countries where the mining companies involved are registered.

The banking system is administered by Artsakhbank (a Yerevan-based Armenian bank fulfilling the functions of the state bank of Nagorno-Karabakh) and a number of other Armenian banks. The republic uses the Armenian dram.

Wine growing and processing of agricultural products, particularly wine (i.e., storage of wine, wine stuffs, cognac alcohol) is one of the prioritised directions of the economic development.

Tourism

Prior to the 2020 war, the republic developed a tourist industry geared to Armenia and the Armenian diaspora. The republic showed a major increase in tourists over the last several years because of Artsakh's many cultural sights. Before the 2020 war there were nine hotels in Stepanakert. The Artsakh development agency says 4,000 tourists visited Artsakh in 2005. The figures rose to 8,000 in 2010 (excluding visitors from Armenia). The agency cooperated with the Armenia Tourism Development Agency (ATDA) as Armenia is the only way tourists (mainly Armenians) can access Artsakh. The Ministry of Foreign Affairs of Artsakh reported continuous expansion of visitors' geography. Tourist infrastructure was developed around sites such as monasteries that showcase the Armenian history in the region, with Islamic sites rarely restored, while some ghost cities and areas near the front line were off limit to tourists.

The Tourism Development Agency of Artsakh was established in Yerevan as a non-governmental organisation in the Republic of Armenia to promote tourism further in Artsakh. It makes preparations for tour operators, travel agencies and journalists covering the region, and arranges for hotel services, shopping, catering, recreation centers.

Tourist attractions included:
 Gandzasar monastery, main tourist attraction.
 Ghazanchetsots Cathedral of the Holy Savior (Under Azerbaijani control since 2020 war)
 Church of the Holy Mother of God "Kanach Zham" (Under Azerbaijani control since 2020 war)
 Amaras Monastery
 Tsitsernavank Monastery (Under Azerbaijani control since 2020 war)
 St. Yeghishe Arakyal Monastery
 Dadivank Monastery
 Gtichavank monastery (Under Azerbaijani control since 2020 war)
 Bri Yeghtsi monastery
 Yerits Mankants
 Katarovank Monastery (Under Azerbaijani control since 2020 war)

Other tourist attractions included:
 Fort Mayraberd (10th–18th centuries) served as the primary bulwark against Turko-nomadic incursions from the eastern steppe. The fort is found to the east of the region's capital city of Stepanakert.
 Govharagha Mosque (18th century), a mosque located in the city of Shusha, now under Azerbaijani control.

Janapar Trail is a marked trail, through mountains, valleys, and villages of Artsakh, with monasteries and fortresses along the way. It's not hikable since the 2020 Nagorno-Karabakh war. The trail was broken into day hikes, which brought tourists to a different village each night. The paths have existed for centuries but now are marked specifically for hikers. The Himnakan Janapar (backbone trail), marked in 2007, leads from the northwest region of Shahumian to the southern town of Hadrut, now under Azerbaijani control. Side trails and mini trails take one to additional parts of Artsakh. The important sites passed along this hike include Dadivank Monastery, Gandzasar monastery, Shusha, the Karkar Canyon with its high cliffs, Zontik Waterfall, and the ruins of Hunot and Gtichavank monastery.

One of the noteworthy side trails is the Gtichavank Loop Trail. This loop starts from Tugh Village, now under Azerbaijani control.

The cost of staying in Artsakh is relatively cheap in comparison with the rest of the region and varies approximately between 25 – US$70 for a single person as of May 2017.

However, those who travelled to Artsakh without the Azerbaijani government's prior consent and permission will be denied entry to Azerbaijan since the country considers Artsakh their territory unlawfully occupied by the Armenian army. The Azerbaijani government also keeps and publishes online a list of foreign nationals who visited these occupied areas without prior approval. In late 2017, the list contained 699 names with additional details (date, country, profession, purpose of visit). The earliest entry recorded a visit to Artsakh that occurred on an unspecified date sometime between 1993 and 1996. The list includes many journalists and members of parliaments of foreign countries.

Artsakh Wine Fest 

Before the 2020 war, the Artsakh Wine Fest took place annually in Togh since 2014. The festival was held on the third Saturday of each September.

The festival was initiated by the Department of Tourism and Protection of Historical Places of the Ministry of Culture, Tourism and Youth Affairs of the Republic of Artsakh and was aimed to develop tourism in Artsakh. It was meant to restore Artsakh winemaking traditions. The festival provided a platform to the winemakers of Artsakh and Armenia giving them an opportunity to sell their products, exchange knowledge, promote their wine etc. The annual festival's program included grape stomping, tasting of traditional Artsakh cuisine, an exhibition of artworks, an exhibition of ancient artefacts that belonged to the Melik Yegan's Palace, as well as an exhibition and sale of local wine, where one could find products from 5 different regions of Artsakh and Armenia. Traditionally, the festival was accompanied by Armenian national singing and dancing. The festival evolved into a national holiday.

Transportation

The transportation system had been damaged by the 1991–1994 conflict. The North–South Artsakh motorway alone largely facilitated the development of the transportation system.

Before the 2020 war, the  Hadrut-Stepanakert-Askeran-Martakert motorway  was the lifeline of Artsakh, and $25 million donated during the Hayastan All-Armenian Foundation telethons was allotted for the construction of the road.

A new route from the Armenian capital Yerevan to Stepanakert was planned to bypass the 8–9 hours drive via the Lachin corridor. It was opened in September 2017. A third road was planned in 2019. Following the 2020 war, a new road will be built along the Lachin corridor to bypass Shusha.

Authorities in the USSR opened a railway line in the Nagorno-Karabakh Autonomous Oblast in 1944. It line connected the capital, Stepanakert, and Yevlax in Azerbaijan. It was built to Russian standard gauge of 1520mm. Due to the first Nagorno-Karabakh War, the line the railway was badly damaged and the line was closed.

It was expected that the airport would have regular flight services only to Yerevan, Armenia, with state-owned carrier Artsakh Air. As of December 2021, flights had not started.

Culture

"We Are Our Mountains" by Sargis Baghdasaryan is a monument located in Stepanakert. The sculpture is widely regarded as a symbol of the de facto independent Republic of Artsakh. It is a large monument from tuff of an old Armenian man and woman hewn from rock, representing the mountain people of Artsakh. It is also known as Tatik yev Papik (Տատիկ և Պապիկ) in Armenian. The sculpture is featured prominently on Artsakh's coat of arms. Artsakh has often been portrayed as a "shield" to the Armenian nation that protects it from Pan-Turkism. When lecturing his fighters during the First Nagorno Karabakh-War, Monte Melkonian would say "If we lose this land, we turn the last page on Armenian history."

Artsakh State Museum is the historical museum of the Republic of Artsakh. Located at 4 Sasunstsi David Street, in Stepanakert, the museum offers an assortment of ancient artefacts and Christian manuscripts. There are also more recent items, ranging in date from the 19th century to World War II and from events of the Karabakh Independence War.

Publications
Azat Artsakh is the official newspaper of the Republic of Artsakh.

Sports

Sports in the Republic of Artsakh are organised by the Artsakh Ministry of Culture and Youth. Due to the non-recognition of Artsakh, sports teams from the country cannot compete in most international tournaments.

Football is the most popular sport in Artsakh. Stepanakert has a well-built football stadium. Since the mid-1990s, football teams from Artsakh started taking part in some domestic competitions in Armenia. Lernayin Artsakh FC represents the city of Stepanakert. In Artsakh, domestic football clubs play in the Artsakh Football League. The Artsakh football league was launched in 2009. The Artsakh national football team was formed in 2012 and played their first competitive match against the Abkhazia national football team in Sokhumi, a match that ended with a result of 1–1 draw. The return match between the unrecognised teams took place at the Stepanakert Stadium, on 21 October 2012, when the team from Artsakh defeated the Abkhazian team 3–0.

There is also interest in other sports, including basketball and volleyball. Sailing is practised in the town of Martakert.

Artsakh sports teams and athletes also participate in the Pan-Armenian Games organised in Armenia.

Holidays

See also

 Armenian-occupied territories surrounding Nagorno-Karabakh
 Community for Democracy and Rights of Nations
 Foreign relations of Artsakh
 Janapar – Multi-section hiking trail going through much of Karabakh
 Outline of the Republic of Artsakh

Notes

References

Further reading

External links

 
First Nagorno-Karabakh War
Nagorno-Karabakh conflict
Subdivisions of Azerbaijan
Separatism in Azerbaijan
South Caucasus
Western Asian countries
Disputed territories in Asia
1992 in Asia
Post-Soviet states
Nagorno-Karabakh Autonomous Oblast
States and territories established in 1992
1992 establishments in Azerbaijan
1992 establishments in Asia
Armenian-speaking countries and territories
Russian-speaking countries and territories
Artsakh
States with limited recognition
Frozen conflict zones
History of the Republic of Artsakh